The 1985–86 Rugby League Premiership was the 12th end of season Rugby League Premiership competition.

The winners were Warrington.

First round

Semi-finals

Final

References

1986 in English rugby league